The Journal of Virology is a biweekly peer-reviewed scientific journal that covers research concerning all aspects of virology. It was established in 1967 and is published by the American Society for Microbiology. Research papers are available free online four months after print publication.

The editor-in-chief is Rozanne M. Sandri-Goldin (University of California, Irvine, California) (2012–present). Past editors-in-chief include Lynn W. Enquist (2002–2012), Thomas Shenk (1994–2002), and Arnold J. Levine (1984–1994).

Abstracting and indexing 
The journal is abstracted and indexed in AGRICOLA, Biological Abstracts, BIOSIS Previews, Chemical Abstracts, Current Contents, EMBASE, MEDLINE/Index Medicus/PubMed, and the Science Citation Index Expanded. Its 2015 impact factor was 4.606, ranking it fifth out of 33 journals in  the category "Virology".

References

External links 

 

Delayed open access journals
Publications established in 1967
English-language journals
Biweekly journals
Academic journals published by learned and professional societies
Virology journals
American Society for Microbiology academic journals